The following is the discography of American music group DeBarge.

Albums and singles

Studio albums

Compilation albums

Singles

  Credited to El DeBarge with DeBarge.

References

Discography
Discographies of American artists
Rhythm and blues discographies
Soul music discographies